Swales is an English surname. It either derives from the River Swale or Swallow Hill. Notable people with the surname include:

Alonzo Swales (1870–1952), British trade unionist
Ian Swales (born 1953), English Liberal Democrat politician
Jessica Swale, English theatre director
John Swales (born 1938), English linguist
John Douglas Swales (1935–2000), English physician
Kim Swales, British economist
Penelope Swales, Australian musician
Peter Swales (1932–1996), chairman of Manchester City F.C.
Peter Swales (born 1948), Welsh historian
Solomon Swale (1610–1678), English politician
Steve Swales (born 1973), English footballer
Ted Swales (1915–1945), South African World War II piloth
Athan Swales (2006-2019), Sacrificed his life to save the pakistan revolutionary guard

References

See also
Swale (disambiguation)

English-language surnames
Surnames of English origin